The 1974-75 season was the Jazz first season in the NBA. The Jazz averaged 101.5 points per game (ranked 10th in NBA) while allowing an average of 109.3 points per game (ranked 18th in NBA).

Draft picks

Roster

Regular season

Season standings

Record vs. opponents

Game log

|- style="background:#fcc;"
| 1
| October 17
| @ New York
| 
| Pete Maravich (15)
| 15,883
| 0–1
|- style="background:#fcc;"
| 2
| October 18
| @ Philadelphia
| 
| Bud Stallworth (24)
| 8,939
| 0–2
|- style="background:#fcc;"
| 3
| October 19
| @ Washington
| 
| Bud Stallworth (19)
| 10,896
| 0–3
|- style="background:#fcc;"
| 4
| October 22
| @ Buffalo
| 
| Ollie Johnson (20)
| 8,251
| 0–4
|- style="background:#fcc;"
| 5
| October 24
| Philadelphia
| 
| Jim Barnett (25)
| 6,459
| 0–5
|- style="background:#fcc;"
| 6
| October 26
| Cleveland
| 
| Jim Barnett (30)
| 3,450
| 0–6
|- style="background:#fcc;"
| 7
| October 30
| Houston
| 
| Jim Barnett (28)
| 3,450
| 0–7

|- style="background:#fcc;"
| 8
| November 1
| @ Detroit
| 
| Jim Barnett (17)
| 4,237
| 0–8
|- style="background:#fcc;"
| 9
| November 5
| @ Kansas City-Omaha
| 
| Pete Maravich (26)
| 3,588
| 0–9
|- style="background:#fcc;"
| 10
| November 6
| Buffalo
| 
| Aaron James (21)
| 3,302
| 0–10
|- style="background:#fcc;"
| 11
| November 8
| Phoenix
| 
| Pete Maravich (29)
| 3,118
| 0–11
|- style="background:#cfc;"
| 12
| November 10
| Portland
| 
| Pete Maravich (30)
| 5,465
| 1–11
|- style="background:#fcc;"
| 13
| November 12
| Chicago
| 
| Pete Maravich (27)
| 4,412
| 1–12
|- style="background:#fcc;"
| 14
| November 15
| Washington
| 
| Pete Maravich (20)
| 5,275
| 1–13
|- style="background:#fcc;"
| 15
| November 16
| @ Atlanta
| 
| Pete Maravich (32)
| 8,249
| 1–14
|- style="background:#fcc;"
| 16
| November 17
| Detroit
| 
| Pete Maravich (24)
| 3,441
| 1–15
|- style="background:#fcc;"
| 17
| November 20
| Seattle
| 
| Jim Barnett (18)
| 4,318
| 1–16
|- style="background:#cfc;"
| 18
| November 22
| Atlanta Hawks
| 
| Pete Maravich (21)
| 7,417
| 2–16
|- style="background:#fcc;"
| 19
| November 23
| @ Cleveland
| 
| Jim Barnett, Louie Nelson (18)
| 8,864
| 2–17
|- style="background:#fcc;"
| 20
| November 26
| @ Phoenix
| 
| Pete Maravich (20)
| 4,931
| 2–18
|- style="background:#fcc;"
| 21
| November 29
| @ L. A. Lakers
| 
| Pete Maravich, Stu Lantz (22)
| 11,224
| 2–19
|- style="background:#fcc;"
| 22
| November 30
| @ Portland
| 
| Aaron James (18)
| 11,896
| 2–20

|- style="background:#fcc;"
| 23
| December 3
| @ Golden State
| 
| Pete Maravich (22)
| 5,081
| 2–21
|- style="background:#fcc;"
| 24
| December 6
| @ Seattle
| 
| Aaron James (22)
| 14,082
| 2–22
|- style="background:#fcc;"
| 25
| December 8
| Boston
| 
| Jim Barnett (29)
| 7,042
| 2–23
|- style="background:#cfc;"
| 26
| December 11
| Golden State
| 
| Jim Barnett, Aaron James (20)
| 3,731
| 3–23
|- style="background:#fcc;"
| 27
| December 13
| @ Chicago
| 
| Louie Nelson, Neal Walk (13)
| 5,198
| 3–24
|- style="background:#fcc;"
| 28
| December 17
| @ Houston
| 
| Ollie Johnson (14)
| 3,333
| 3–25
|- style="background:#fcc;"
| 29
| December 18
| @ Washington
| 
| Jim Barnett (16)
| 4,227
| 3–26
|- style="background:#fcc;"
| 30
| December 20
| @ Boston
| 
| Louie Nelson (21)
| 6,883
| 3–27
|- style="background:#fcc;"
| 31
| December 22
| @ Milwaukee
| 
| E.C. Coleman (14)
| 9,038
| 3–28
|- style="background:#fcc;"
| 32
| December 23
| @ Cleveland
| 
| Pete Maravich (24)
| 7,867
| 3–29
|- style="background:#fcc;"
| 33
| December 28
| @ New York
| 
| E.C. Coleman (23)
| 18,555
| 3–30

|- style="background:#fcc;"
| 34
| January 2
| @ Detroit
| 
| Pete Maravich (31)
| 5,176
| 3–31
|- style="background:#fcc;"
| 35
| January 4
| @ Seattle
| 
| Neal Walk (20)
| 13,474
| 3–32
|- style="background:#fcc;"
| 36
| January 5
| @ Portland Trail Blazers
| 
| E.C. Coleman (21)
| 8,968
| 3–33
|- style="background:#fcc;"
| 37
| January 7
| @ Golden State
| 
| E.C. Coleman, Aaron James (18)
| 4,164
| 3–34
|- style="background:#cfc;"
| 38
| January 10
| Houston
| 
| Pete Maravich (38)
| 2,368
| 4–34
|- style="background:#cfc;"
| 39
| January 17
| Seattle
| 
| Pete Maravich (16)
| 3,120
| 5–34
|- style="background:#fcc;"
| 40
| January 19
| Buffalo
| 
| Pete Maravich (40)
| 4,214
| 5–35
|- style="background:#fcc;"
| 41
| January 21
| @ Atlanta
| 
| Pete Maravich (26)
| 3,508
| 5–36
|- style="background:#fcc;"
| 42
| January 22
| Boston
| 
| Pete Maravich (34)
| 5,723
| 5–37
|- style="background:#fcc;"
| 43
| January 24
| @ L.A. Lakers
| 
| Louie Nelson (28)
| 10,880
| 5–38
|- style="background:#fcc;"
| 44
| January 25
| @ Phoenix
| 
| Louie Nelson (23)
| 5,872
| 5–39
|- style="background:#fcc;"
| 45
| January 27
| Milwaukee
| 
| Pete Maravich (36)
| 6,419
| 5–40
|- style="background:#fcc;"
| 46
| January 29
| L.A. Lakers
| 
| Pete Maravich (32)
| 2,887
| 5–41
|- style="background:#fcc;"
| 47
| January 31
| Washington
| 
| Louie Nelson (24)
| 2,812
| 5–42

|- style="background:#cfc;"
| 48
| February 2
| New York
| 
| Pete Maravich (33)
| 6,419
| 6–42
|- style="background:#fcc;"
| 49
| February 5
| Houston
| 
| Louie Nelson (18)
| 3,063
| 6–43
|- style="background:#fcc;"
| 50
| February 7
| @ Milwaukee
| 
| Pete Maravich (27)
| 10,938
| 6–44
|- style="background:#cfc;"
| 51
| February 8
| @ Atlanta
| 
| Pete Maravich (47)
| 13,653
| 7–44
|- style="background:#cfc;"
| 52
| February 10
| Atlanta
| 
| Louie Nelson (29)
| 4,693
| 8–44
|- style="background:#fcc;"
| 53
| February 11
| @ Cleveland
| 
| Pete Maravich (18)
| 3,788
| 8–45
|- style="background:#cfc;"
| 54
| February 14
| @ Houston
| 
| Louie Nelson (23)
| 3,342
| 9–45
|- style="background:#cfc;"
| 55
| February 16
| Milwaukee
| 
| Louie Nelson (27)
| 7,435
| 10–45
|- style="background:#cfc;"
| 56
| February 18
| Philadelphia
| 
| Pete Maravich (33)
| 5,048
| 11–45
|- style="background:#cfc;"
| 57
| February 20
| Portland
| 
| Pete Maravich (32)
| 4,918
| 12–45
|- style="background:#cfc;"
| 58
| February 21
| Phoenix
| 
| Pete Maravich (22)
| 4,563
| 13–45
|- style="background:#cfc;"
| 59
| February 23
| Houston
| 
| Pete Maravich (38)
| 6,425
| 14–45
|- style="background:#fcc;"
| 60
| February 25
| Chicago
| 
| Nate Williams (20)
| 7,024
| 14–46
|- style="background:#fcc;"
| 61
| February 27
| @ Buffalo
| 
| Pete Maravich (24)
| 5,578
| 14–47
|- style="background:#cfc;"
| 62
| February 28
| Kansas City-Omaha
| 
| Pete Maravich (34)
| 5,370
| 15–47

|- style="background:#fcc;"
| 63
| March 1
| @ Houston
| 
| Aaron James (21)
| 6,358
| 15–48
|- style="background:#cfc;"
| 64
| March 5
| L.A. Lakers
| 
| Pete Maravich (30)
| 6,554
| 16–48
|- style="background:#cfc;"
| 65
| March 7
| Golden State
| 
| Pete Maravich (34)
| 6,218
| 17–48
|- style="background:#fcc;"
| 66
| March 8
| @ Atlanta
| 
| Aaron James (19)
| 6,131
| 17–49
|- style="background:#cfc;"
| 67
| March 9
| Cleveland
| 
| Pete Maravich (26)
| 5,031
| 18–49
|- style="background:#fcc;"
| 68
| March 11
| @ Cleveland
| 
| Pete Maravich (23)
| 5,369
| 18–50
|- style="background:#cfc;"
| 69
| March 15
| Atlanta
| 
| Pete Maravich (24)
| 3,623
| 19–50
|- style="background:#fcc;"
| 70
| March 16
| Cleveland
| 
| Aaron James (24)
| 3,824
| 19–51
|- style="background:#cfc;"
| 71
| March 19
| @ Philadelphia
| 
| Pete Maravich (36)
| 6,411
| 20–51
|- style="background:#fcc;"
| 72
| March 20
| @ Kansas City-Omaha
| 
| Pete Maravich (24)
| 6,138
| 20–52
|- style="background:#fcc;"
| 73
| March 21
| Washington
| 
| Louie Nelson (26)
| 6,273
| 20–53
|- style="background:#fcc;"
| 74
| March 23
| Detroit
| 
| Nate Williams (28)
| 4,182
| 20–54
|- style="background:#cfc;"
| 75
| March 25
| Kansas City-Omaha
| 
| Pete Maravich (36)
| 3,388
| 21–54
|- style="background:#fcc;"
| 76
| March 26
| @ Boston
| 
| Aaron James (20)
| 15,320
| 21–55
|- style="background:#cfc;"
| 77
| March 28
| New York
| 
| Pete Maravich (32)
| 8,002
| 22–55
|- style="background:#fcc;"
| 78
| March 29
| @ Houston
| 
| Bernie Fryer (17)
| 7,328
| 22–56
|- style="background:#cfc;"
| 79
| March 30
| Atlanta
| 
| Nate Williams (18)
| 5,422
| 23–56

|- style="background:#fcc;"
| 80
| April 1
| Washington
| 
| Pete Maravich (19)
| 7,312
| 23–57
|- style="background:#fcc;"
| 81
| April 4
| @ Chicago
| 
| Pete Maravich (31)
| 11,312
| 23–58
|- style="background:#fcc;"
| 82
| April 6
| @ Washington
| 
| Aaron James (34)
| 13,267
| 23–59

Player stats

Source: Basketball-Reference.com

References

 Jazz on Basketball Reference

New Orleans
Utah Jazz seasons
New Orl
New Orl